Nosferattus aegis is a jumping spider.

Name
The epitheton is Latin for "shield" and refers to the shape of the cymbium.

Appearance
N. aegis is about 4 mm long, with females up to 5 mm.

Distribution
N. aegis is only known from the State of Tocantins in Brazil.

References
  (2008): The world spider catalog, version 9.0. American Museum of Natural History.

External links
Three new genera of jumping spider from Brazil (Araneae, Salticidae) (2005)

Sitticini
Spiders of Brazil
Spiders described in 2005